Samuel Goodman may refer to:

 Samuel Goodman (cricketer) (1877–1905), American cricketer
 Samuel Goodman (rugby union) ( 1920–1924), American rugby union player and manager
 Sam Goodman (1931–1991), American Southern gospel singer and songwriter

See also  
 Goodman (surname)
 Samuel (name)